Lenore M. Kight (September 26, 1911 – February 9, 2000), later known by her married name Lenore Wingard, was an American competition swimmer who represented the United States at two consecutive Summer Olympics.  At the 1932 Summer Olympics in Los Angeles, she won a silver medal in the women's 400-meter freestyle event.  Four years later at the 1936 Summer Olympics in Berlin, she won a bronze medal in the 400-meter freestyle event. During her amateur career Kight set 7 world and 24 national records, and won 23 national swimming titles. In 1937 she turned professional and won the long-distance race at the Toronto Canadian Exhibition.

After retiring from active competitions Kight worked as a swimming instructor. In 1981 she was inducted into the International Swimming Hall of Fame.

See also
 List of members of the International Swimming Hall of Fame
 List of Olympic medalists in swimming (women)

References

External links

 "Sport: Daughters' Girl" Time magazine 6 August 1934
 "Athletes: Lenore Kight" Photograph in the February 1934 issue of Vanity Fair
 "Holds 7 world's records in speed swimming" Lenore Kight Wingard in a Camel cigarette advertisement, Life magazine 19 July 1937, back cover

1911 births
2000 deaths
American female freestyle swimmers
Olympic bronze medalists for the United States in swimming
Olympic silver medalists for the United States in swimming
People from Frostburg, Maryland
Swimmers at the 1932 Summer Olympics
Swimmers at the 1936 Summer Olympics
Medalists at the 1936 Summer Olympics
Medalists at the 1932 Summer Olympics
20th-century American women
20th-century American people